The Fort Meade radar station was a Cold War military site with several sets of radar equipment in various Army and USAF radar networks.   The site operated c. 1950 until 1979 and had a Project Nike command post and radar network.

Lashup site L-14
Site L-14 of the temporary Lashup Radar Network was the ground-controlled interception radar station established at Fort George G. Meade until the radar's surveillance area was covered by a Quantico AFS radar in 1955.  The Fort Meade radar station also had the first experimental AN/GSG-2 Antiaircraft Defense System in 1955.

ARAACOM site W-13DC
In 1957 the Fort Meade station was designated an Army Air-Defense Command Post (AADCP) for the Washington-Baltimore Defense Area.  The site had the first operational Martin AN/FSG-I Antiaircraft Defense System, a fire distribution center for Nike Missiles and which was operated by the 35th Antiaircraft Artillery Brigade. Designated W-13DC, the site had an AN/FPS-67 search radar and later a solid-state Hughes AN/TSQ-51 Air Defense Command and Coordination System.  After 1957, Fort Meade became the Headquarters, 2nd Region, Army Air Defense Command.

ADC site RP-54
On October 1, 1961, W-13DC was integrated with the Aerospace Defense Command network as replacement site RP-54 operated by the USAF's 770th Airborne Control and Warning Squadron that transferred from former site P-54 at Palermo Air Force Station, New Jersey.  Site RP-54 became part of the 1957 Washington Air Defense Sector) with an interface with the DC-04 SAGE system direction center at Fort Lee Air Force Station (inactivated March 1, 1983).

NORAD site Z-227
On July 1, 1963, the station was redesignated as site Z-227 (Palermo AFS re-opened as site Z-54), and the USAF unit was renamed the 770th Radar Squadron assuming control of the AN/FPS-67 and installing one each AN/FPS-6 and AN/FPS-6B height-finder radars by 1962. In 1964 an AN/FPS-90 replaced Meade's AN/FPS-6B, and the AN/FPS-6 was shut down; while in 1966 the AN/FPS-67 was upgraded to an AN/FPS-67B.

In addition to an annex at the former Manassas Air Force Station, the Fort Meade radar station had unmanned AN/FPS-14 Gap Filler annexes at Hermanville, Maryland (RP-54A/Z-227A) and Hanover, Pennsylvania (RP-54B/Z-227B).  The Washington AADCPs at Suitland & Ft Meade were deactivated on September 1, 1974; and USAF air defense operations at Ft Meade ended October 1, 1979 (a plan to use the site in the 1983 Joint Surveillance System was not implemented).

References

United States Army command posts
Semi-Automatic Ground Environment sites
U.S. Army Nike sites
Military installations established in the 1950s
1953 establishments in Maryland
1994 in military history
Military installations in Maryland
Military installations closed in 1979
1979 disestablishments in Maryland